The 19th Cannes Film Festival was held from 5 to 20 May 1966. To honour the festival's 20th anniversary, a special prize was given.

The Grand Prix du Festival International du Film went to the Signore & Signori by Pietro Germi, in tie with Un homme et une femme by Claude Lelouch. The festival opened with Modesty Blaise, directed by Joseph Losey and closed with Faraon, directed by Jerzy Kawalerowicz.

Jury

The following people were appointed as the Jury of the 1966 film competition:

Feature films
Sophia Loren (Italy) Jury President
Marcel Achard (France)
Vinicius de Moraes (Brazil)
Tetsuro Furukaki (Japan) (author)
Maurice Genevoix (France)
Jean Giono (France)
Maurice Lehmann (France)
Richard Lester (UK)
Denis Marion (Belgium)
André Maurois (France)
Marcel Pagnol (France)
Yuli Raizman (Soviet Union)
Armand Salacrou (France)
Peter Ustinov (UK)
Short films
Charles Duvanel (Switzerland)
 (France) (author)
Marcel Ichac (France)
Jean Vivie (France) (CST official)
Bo Widerberg (Sweden)

Official selection

In competition - Feature film
The following feature films competed for the Grand Prix du Festival International du Film:

Alfie by Lewis Gilbert
L'armata Brancaleone by Mario Monicelli
The Ashes (Popioly) by Andrzej Wajda
The Birds, the Bees and the Italians (Signore & Signori) by Pietro Germi
Chimes at Midnight (Falstaff) (Campanadas a medianoche) by Orson Welles
Doctor Zhivago by David Lean
The Hawks and the Sparrows (Uccellacci e uccellini) by Pier Paolo Pasolini
Hello, That's Me! (Barev, yes em) by Frunze Dovlatyan
The Hour and Turn of Augusto Matraga (A Hora e Vez de Augusto Matraga) by Roberto Santos
Hunger (Sult) by Henning Carlsen
It (Es) by Ulrich Schamoni
Lenin in Poland (Lenin v Polshe) by Sergei Yutkevich
Mademoiselle by Tony Richardson
A Man and a Woman (Un homme et une femme) by Claude Lelouch
Modesty Blaise by Joseph Losey
Morgan: A Suitable Case for Treatment by Karel Reisz
The Nun (La Religieuse) by Jacques Rivette
Ön by Alf Sjöberg
Pharaoh (Faraon) by Jerzy Kawalerowicz
The Pipes (Dýmky) by Vojtěch Jasný
Răscoala by Mircea Mureșan
The Round-Up (Szegénylegények) by Miklós Jancsó
Seconds by John Frankenheimer
With the East Wind (Con el viento solano) by Mario Camus
Young Törless (Der junge Törless) by Volker Schlöndorff

Short film competition
The following short films competed for the Grand Prix:

Alberto Giacometti by Ernst Scheidegger and Peter Munger
Bruegel et la folie des hommes - dulle griet by Jean Cleinge
Le Chant du monde de Jean Lurcat by Pierre Biro and Victoria Mercanton
Cislice by Pavel Prochazka
The Dot and the Line by Chuck Jones
The Drag by Carlos Marchiori
Équivoque 1900 by Monique Lepeuve
De Gewonde by Theo Van Haren Noman
Miejsce by Edward Sturlis
Muzikalno prase by Zlatko Grgic
Nô by Eiji Murayama
Reflections on Love by Joe Massot
Les Rendez-vous de l'été by Jacques Ertaud and Raymond Zumstein
Skaterdater by Noel Black
L'Urlo by Camillo Bazzoni

Parallel section

International Critics' Week
The following feature films were screened for the 5th International Critics' Week (5e Semaine de la Critique):

 Black Girl (La Noire de...) by Ousmane Sembene (France, Senegal)
 Bloko by Ado Kyrou (Greece)
 Children's Sicknesses (Gyerekbetegségek) by Ferenc Kardos, János Rózsa (Hungary)
 Du courage pour chaque jour by Evald Schorm (Czechoslovakia)
 O desafio by Paulo César Saraceni (Brazil)
 Fata morgana by Vicente Aranda (Spain)
 Man Is Not a Bird (Čovek nije tica) by Dusan Makavejev (Yugoslavia)
 Nicht versöhnt by Jean-Marie Straub (West Germany)
 Le Père Noël a les yeux bleus by Jean Eustache (France)
 Winter Kept Us Warm by David Secter (Canada)

Awards

Official awards
The following films and people received the 1966 Official selection awards:
Grand Prix du Festival International du Film:
The Birds, the Bees and the Italians (Signore & Signori) by Pietro Germi
A Man and a Woman (Un homme et une femme) by Claude Lelouch
Prix spécial du Jury: Alfie by Lewis Gilbert
Best Director: Sergei Yutkevich for Lenin in Poland (Lenin v Polshe)
Best Actress: Vanessa Redgrave for Morgan: A Suitable Case for Treatment
Best Actor: Per Oscarsson for Sult
Best First Work: Răscoala by Mircea Mureșan
20th Anniversary Prize: Chimes at Midnight (Falstaff) (Campanadas a medianoche) by Orson Welles
Short films
Short Film Gran Prix: Skaterdater by Noel Black
Technical Grand Prize: Skaterdater by Noel Black

Independent awards
FIPRESCI
FIPRESCI Prize: Young Törless (Der junge Törless) by Volker Schlöndorff
Special Mention: Chimes at Midnight (Falstaff) (Campanadas a medianoche) by Orson Welles
Commission Supérieure Technique
Technical Grand Prize: Chimes at Midnight (Falstaff) (Campanadas a medianoche) by Orson Welles
OCIC Award
 A Man and a Woman (Un homme et une femme) by Claude Lelouch
Other awards
Special Mention: Totò, for his acting performance in The Hawks and the Sparrows (Uccellacci e uccellini)

References

Media

British Pathé: Cannes Film Festival 1966 footage
British Pathé: Cannes Film Festival 1966 footage
British Pathé: Cannes Film Festival 1966 Originals
INA: Opening of the 1966 festival (commentary in French)
INA: List of winners of the 1966 festival (commentary in French)

External links 
1966 Cannes Film Festival (web.archive)
Official website Retrospective 1966 
Cannes Film Festival:1966  at Internet Movie Database

Cannes Film Festival, 1966
Cannes Film Festival, 1966
Cannes Film Festival